The 1996 cruise missile strikes on Iraq, codenamed Operation Desert Strike, were joint United States Navy–United States Air Force strikes conducted on 3 September against air defense targets in southern Iraq, in response to an Iraqi offensive in the Kurdish Civil War.

Iraqi offensive
On 31 August 1996, the Iraqi military launched its biggest offensive since 1991 against the city of Erbil in to defuse the Kurdish Civil War between the Patriotic Union of Kurdistan and Kurdistan Democratic Party. This attack stoked American fears and placed Iraqi president Saddam Hussein in clear violation of United Nations Security Council Resolution 688 forbidding repression of Iraqs ethnic minorities.

Cruise missile strikes
The strikes were initially planned to be by aircraft launched from the aircraft carrier , including aircraft from Fighter Squadron 11 (VF-11) and Fighter Squadron 31 (VF-31), both operating F-14D Tomcats; Electronic Attack Squadron 139 (VAQ-139), operating EA-6B Prowlers; Attack Squadron 196 (VA-196), operating A-6E SWIP Intruders equipped with the Target Recognition and Attack Multi-Sensor (TRAM) system; Anti-Submarine Squadron 35 (VS-35) flying S-3B Vikings; and Strike Fighter Squadron 113 (VFA-113) and Strike Fighter Squadron 25 (VFA-25), both operating F/A-18C Hornets. However the strike was instead launched by U.S. Navy surface warships and U.S. Air Force (USAF) bombers, using cruise missiles.

On 3 September 1996, a joint operation by the U.S. Navy's Carl Vinson Carrier Battle Group and the USAF, a combined strike team consisting of the guided-missile cruiser , the guided-missile destroyer , and B-52 Stratofortress bombers escorted by F-14D Tomcat fighters from Carl Vinson, with the nuclear-powered guided-missile cruiser  serving as Air Warfare Commander, launched 27 cruise missiles against Iraqi air defense targets in southern Iraq. The missiles hit targets in and around Kut, Iskandariyah, Nasiriyah, and Tallil.

Aftermath
The attacks were primarily aimed at retaliation for the targeting of USAF fighters in the Northern and Southern no-fly zones, and were targeted at surface-to-air missile sites and command, control, and communication locations, with the intention of degrading the Iraqi air defense infrastructure.  These strikes, along with follow-on deployments of troops, aircraft, and the addition of a second aircraft carrier to the region, achieved their desired results.

It is debatable whether the attacks did or did not have a substantial effect on Iraqs northern campaign. Once they installed the Kurdistan Democratic Party (KDP) in control of Irbil, Iraqi troops withdrew from the Kurdish region back to their initial positions. The KDP drove the Patriotic Union of Kurdistan (PUK) from its other strongholds, and with additional Iraqi help, captured Sulaymaniyah. The PUK and its leader, Jalal Talabani, retreated to the border, and U.S. forces evacuated 700 Iraqi National Congress personnel and 6,000 pro-Western Kurds out of northern Iraq.

In response to Iraqs moves, the United States and United Kingdom also expanded Operation Southern Watch and the southern Iraqi no-fly zones from the 32nd parallel to the 33rd parallel, bringing it to the edges of Baghdad itself.

See also
 January 1993 airstrikes on Iraq
1993 cruise missile strikes on Iraq
 1998 bombing of Iraq

References

External links
 Operation Desert Strike at globalsecurity.org

cruise missile strikes
cruise missile strikes on Iraq
Battles involving Iraq
Battles involving the United States
Military operations involving the United States
Airstrikes conducted by the United States
Iraq–United States military relations
cruise missile strikes on Iraq
Presidency of Bill Clinton